Tozzi is an Italian surname. It may refer to:

 Antonio Tozzi (1736-1812), Italian composer
 Bruno Tozzi (1656-1743), Italian monk and botanist
 Claudio Tozzi (b. 1944), Brazilian artist
 Fausto Tozzi (1921–1978), Italian film actor and screenwriter
 Federigo Tozzi (1883-1920), Italian writer
 Gianni Tozzi (born 1962), Italian former athlete
 Gianpiero Tozzi (b. 1994), Italian footballer 
 Giorgio Tozzi (1923-2011), American opera singer
 Humberto Tozzi (1934–1980), Brazilian international footballer 
 Jim Tozzi (b. 1938), American lobbyist
 Jim Tozzi (PFFR) (b. 1967), American artist, commercial director, producer, voice actor, and musician
 John T. Tozzi, former rear admiral in the United States Coast Guard
 Mario Tozzi (1895–1979), Italian painter
 Nicoletta Tozzi (1966), former Italian female middle-distance runner
 Ricardo Tozzi (b. 1975), Brazilian actor
 Roberto Tozzi (b. 1958), Italian sprinter who specialized in the 400 metres
 Romano Tozzi Borsoi (b. 1979), Italian footballer
 Silvio Tozzi (1908–?), Italian wrestler
 Tahyna Tozzi (b. 1986), Australian model, singer, and actress
 Umberto Tozzi (b. 1952), Italian singer

Surnames of Italian origin